Starotumbagushevo (İśke Tombağoş) is a rural locality (a village) and the administrative centre of Starotumbagushevsky Selsoviet, Sharansky District, Bashkortostan, Russia. The population was 289 as of 2010. There are 4 streets.

Geography 
Starotumbagushevo is located 9 km north of Sharan (the district's administrative centre) by road. Novotumbagushevo is the nearest rural locality.

References 

Rural localities in Sharansky District